John Manuel may refer to:
 John Manuel (writer), baseball writer and scout
 John G. Manuel, Canadian First World War flying ace

See also